Thomas William Coke, 3rd Earl of Leicester  (20 July 1848 – 19 November 1941), known as Viscount Coke until 1909, was a British peer and soldier.

Biography

Leicester was the eldest son of Thomas Coke, 2nd Earl of Leicester, by his first wife Juliana (née Whitbread).

He was a Colonel in the 2nd Battalion of the Scots Guards and served in Egypt in 1882, and at Suakin in 1885. Having retired from the regular army, he was appointed lieutenant-colonel in command of the Norfolk Artillery Militia on 21 February 1894. Following the outbreak of the Second Boer War in late 1899, the militia regiment was embodied in May 1900, and around 100 men were sent to South Africa under the command of Lord Coke. For his service in the war, he was mentioned in despatches (including the final despatch by Lord Kitchener dated 23 June 1902), and was made a Companion of the Order of St Michael and St George (CMG) in the October 1902 South African Honours list. In January 1903 he was appointed an Aide-de-Camp for Militia to the King.

He was made a Knight Grand Cross of the Royal Victorian Order (GCVO) in 1908.

Lord Leicester held the position of Lord-Lieutenant of Norfolk from 1906 to 1929. He succeeded his father to the earldom and Holkham Hall in 1909.

Personal life
Lord Leicester married the Hon. Alice Emily White, daughter of Luke White, 2nd Baron Annaly, on 26 August 1879. They had five children:
Thomas William Coke, 4th Earl of Leicester born 9 July 1880, died 21 August 1949
Lieutenant Hon. Arthur George Coke, born 6 April 1882, killed in action on 21 May 1915 whilst serving with the Royal Naval Air Service. He is commemorated on the Helles Memorial at Gallipoli. Father of Anthony Coke, 6th Earl of Leicester.
Lady Marjory Alice Coke, born 1884, died 24 December 1946
Hon. Roger Coke, AFC, born 28 December 1886, died 14 Oct 1960; an officer in the Royal Air Force.
Lady Alexandra Marie Bridget Coke, born 1891, died 1984; married 1910 David Ogilvy, 12th Earl of Airlie

Alice Coke, Countess of Leicester was later appointed Dame Commander of the Order of the British Empire. She died in 1936. Lord Leicester survived her by five years and died in November 1941, aged 93. He was succeeded the earldom by his eldest son Thomas.

References

Sources

Kidd, Charles, Williamson, David (editors). Debrett's Peerage and Baronetage (1990 edition). New York: St Martin's Press, 1990, 

1848 births
1941 deaths
Military personnel from Norfolk
Thomas Coke
British Army personnel of the Anglo-Egyptian War
British Army personnel of the Mahdist War
British Army personnel of the Second Boer War
3rd Earl of Leicester
Lord-Lieutenants of Norfolk
Scots Guards officers
Knights Grand Cross of the Royal Victorian Order
Companions of the Order of St Michael and St George